Rozalia Husti (born 28 January 1964) is a retired Romanian-German foil fencer. Competing for Romania she won team silver medals at the 1984 Olympics and 1987 World Championships. In 1990 she moved to Germany, where she worked as a fencing coach at FC Tauberbischofsheim. She continued competing and won team bronze medals at the 1991 world and 1992 European championships.

References

External links
 

1964 births
Living people
German female foil fencers
German people of Hungarian descent
Romanian female foil fencers
Romanian people of Hungarian descent
Olympic fencers of Romania
Fencers at the 1984 Summer Olympics
Olympic silver medalists for Romania
Olympic medalists in fencing
Sportspeople from Satu Mare
Medalists at the 1984 Summer Olympics
Universiade medalists in fencing
Universiade silver medalists for Romania